Elizabeth Inglis (born Desiree Mary Lucy Hawkins, July 10, 1913 – August 25, 2007), also known as Elizabeth Earl, was an English actress, known for her role in The Letter.

Early life
Inglis was born Desiree Mary Lucy Hawkins in Colchester, Essex, the daughter of Margaret Inglis (née Hunt) and Alan George Hawkins.

Career
Her screen debut was in the 1934 film, Borrowed Clothes. She then had a small part in Alfred Hitchcock's The 39 Steps (1935) as Hilary Jordan.

She played the role of the young maid Nancy in the original British production of Patrick Hamilton's Victorian stage thriller Gas Light, which premiered December 5, 1938, and closed June 10, 1939, after a total of 141 performances. Inglis and the rest of the cast recreated their stage roles for a 1939 television presentation performed live on BBC Television.

In Hollywood, Inglis played the role of Adele Ainsworth in William Wyler's 1940 film The Letter. By this time she was credited as Elizabeth Earl.

Personal life
In 1942, she married Pat Weaver (1908–2002), an American broadcasting executive; he was president of NBC television between 1953 and 1955.

After marrying, Inglis retired from acting. The couple had two children, one of whom, Susan, became actress Sigourney Weaver. A photograph of Inglis was seen in a deleted scene in Aliens as Weaver's character's elderly grown daughter, Amanda Ripley.

Inglis died on August 25, 2007, in Santa Barbara, California, aged 94.

Filmography

References

External links
 

1913 births
2007 deaths
English film actresses
People from Colchester
English emigrants to the United States